This is a list of the 10 most popular songs in Mexico for each year between 1940 and 1949, as published in the book "El Sound Track de la vida cotidiana", by Fernando Mejía Barquera.

The following year-end charts were elaborated by Mejía Barquera, based on weekly charts that were published on the magazines Radiolandia for the years 1944 to 1946 and Selecciones musicales for 1948 and 1949 (the latter were taken from Roberto Ayala's 1962 book "Musicosas: manual del comentarista de radio y televisión" which compiled the Selecciones musicales weekly charts from 1948 to 1960; those charts were, according to Ayala, based on record sales, jukebox plays, radio and television airplay, and sheet music sales). Mejía Barquera then took one chart from the second week of every month of a calendar year, so as to have twelve charts per year, and asigned "points" to the songs on those charts based on their ranking (from 10 points for a first place to 1 point for a tenth place), adding up the points to make his year-end charts.

1944

1945

1946

1948

1949

References

Mexico
Mexican record charts
1940s in music
1940s in Mexico